A gubernatorial election was held on 8 April 1979 to elect the Governor of Saga Prefecture. Kumao Katsuki won the election.

Candidates
 - Deputy Governor of Saga Prefecture, age 63
, age 63
 - former Social Insurance Agency Commissioner, age 55
 - candidate in the 1971 Saga gubernational election and three-time House of Councillors candidate, age 70
 - also a House of Representatives candidate in the same year, age 30

Results

References

Saga gubernatorial elections
1979 elections in Japan